Angelica callii is an uncommon species of angelica known as Call's angelica. It is endemic to the Sierra Nevada of California, where it grows by forest streams.

This is a taprooted perennial herb producing a rough, hollow, erect stem to heights between 1 and 2 meters. The leaves are made up of highly dissected toothed leaflets each up to 13 centimeters. The inflorescence is a compound umbel with up to 50 rays bearing clusters of hairy flowers.

References

Jepson Manual Treatment
USDA Plants Profile

callii
Endemic flora of California
Flora of the Sierra Nevada (United States)
Plants described in 1977